Weydon School is a secondary academy school located in Weydon Lane, Farnham, Surrey, England. It is the lead school of the Weydon Multi Academy Trust.

History
Opened as Weydon County Secondary School on 16 September 1957. The first headmaster (1957 to 1968) was Mr A H Surman, who was succeeded by Mr Chambers. By that time there were some 500 students in 5 academic years, years 1 to 4 divided into four streams based on perceived ability/achievement, year 5 divided into 2 streams, students from the lower 2 streams having left at age 15.

Weydon School was granted Specialist Science Status in 2003.

Site
Currently the school caters for children from 11 to 16. Its main feeder schools are Highfield South Farnham, Potters Gate CE Primary School, Rowledge CE Primary School, St Peter's School, South Farnham School and Waverley Abbey Junior School. The majority of the students go on from Weydon to The Sixth Form College, Farnborough, Farnham College, Alton College or Godalming College.

Weydon School underwent expansion in 2008 as part of the Faraday project funded by the Government and aimed to increase attainment levels in science. Weydon was selected as one of only a few schools throughout the country to receive this grant. The money was spent on a new high tech science computer room, 'rainforest room' and state of the art labs were built over a summer.

A further expansion project was announced in 2013, with work starting in 2014. It expanded the cafeteria (previously known as Breakpoint Cafe), built new changing rooms and rebuilt the arts and humanities departments. The new 'Medici' art block was opened on 4 March 2016 containing a state-of-the-art theatre, art rooms and additional facilities. Multiple performances have been displayed within the Medici theatre alongside art displays throughout the year. The 'Globe' block was opened in 2017, it predominantly houses History, English and Geography, but also contains classrooms dedicated to Film and Media Studies as well as Religious Studies. The building contains the LRC (Learning Resource Centre), consisting of a extensive library and computer suite.

Organisation
The school is split into two 'colleges' - River and Castle. These aim to create a small-school feeling as the school grows in enrolment numbers.

Within the two colleges, students are organised into a tutor group of 28-30 students. The tutor groups are named after famous British rivers or castles. The Castle tutor groups are: Arundel, Newark, Pendragon, Ravensworth, Sterling, Windsor; The River tutor groups are: Avon, Clyde, Eden, Mersey,  Severn, Tyne.

Inspection
The Ofsted inspection of the school in 2009 was Outstanding after receiving a satisfactory rating in 2006.

Weydon Multi Academy Trust
The Weydon Multi Academy Trust (WMAT) is made up of six local schools: Weydon School in Farnham, Farnham Heath End School in Farnham, The Ridgeway Community School in Farnham, Woolmer Hill School in Haslemere, The Abbey School in Farnham, The Park School In Woking, and Rodborough School in Milford, Surrey. It aims to "share good practice[and] raise standards and performance across all of the schools". It is headed by John Winter (previous head teacher of Weydon School) acting as the CEO of the Trust.

i2i Teaching Partnership
The i2i Teaching Partnership is teacher college based in Weydon School. The partnership has schools in Surrey, Hampshire, Berkshire and Middlesex.

GCSE
In the 2020 Sunday Times Parent Power Schools Guide, Weydon School was ranked first (having come in fourth the previous year) with 45.1% of students achieving GCSE A*/A/9/8/7

Notable alumni
Henry Bond, artist and photographer
Martin Millett, classical archaeologist and academic
Graham Thorpe, England cricket batsman
Rachel Morris, para cyclist and rower
Graham Ross, conductor and composer

References

External links
Weydon School

Secondary schools in Surrey
Academies in Surrey
Farnham